Hanuman Vijay is a 1974 Bollywood film directed by Babubhai Mistri.

Plot
The story mainly revolves around Lord Hanuman. The relationship between him and his wife Makri and how Hanuman helped Lord Ram and his younger brother Lakshman when Ahiravan kidnaps both brothers under Ravana's order.

Cast
Hercules as Hanuman 
Ashish Kumar (actor) as Shri Ram 
Kanan Kaushal as Chandrasena 
Sujata as Jal Makri 
Manher Desai as Ahiravan 
Raj Kumar as Lakshman

Soundtrack 
The music was composed by Ajay Vishwanathd.

External links
 

1974 films
1970s Hindi-language films
Indian fantasy films
Films based on the Ramayana
Films directed by Babubhai Mistry
Hanuman in popular culture
1970s fantasy films